The Indian locomotive class WDS-2 is a class of diesel-electric locomotive that was developed in 1954 by Kraus Maffei for Indian Railways. The model name stands for broad gauge (W), Diesel (D), Shunting locomotive (S) engine, 2nd generation (2). They entered service in 1955. A total of 20 WDS-2 was built in Germany between 1954 and 1955, which made them the most numerous class of shunting diesel locomotive until the WDS-4B.

The WDS-2 served both shunting and departmental trains for over 45 years. As of January 2020, all locomotives have been withdrawn and subsequently scrapped. None of the 30 locomotives have been preserved

History 
These locomotives were imported from Germany in 1954. They are based on the Krauss-Maffei ML 400 C with the power-pack of Krauss-Maffei ML 440 C. They are among the first diesel locomotives of India. They were very noisy in operation.Very vintage looking, too.

Former sheds 

 Kurla(CR)
 Shakurbasti (SSB)
 Lucknow (LKD)
  All the locomotives of this class has been withdrawn from service.

See also 

 Rail transport in India#History
 Locomotives of India
 Rail transport in India
 Indian locomotive class WDM-2

References

Notes

Bibliography

C locomotives
Railway locomotives introduced in 1954
5 ft 6 in gauge locomotives
Diesel-hydraulic locomotives of India
Krauss-Maffei locomotives